Saint Agnes of Rome (291–304) is a virgin martyr, a patron saint of chastity, feasted on 21 January.

Saint Agnes or St Agnes may also refer to:

Other saints
 Agnes of Assisi (1197/1198–1253), abbess of the Poor Ladies, feast day 16 November
 Agnes of Bohemia (1211–1282), also known as Agnes of Prague, feast day 2 March
 Agnes of Montepulciano (1268–1317), feast day 20 April

Places

Australia 
 St Agnes, Queensland, a locality in the Bundaberg Region
 St Agnes, South Australia, Australia

France 
 Sainte-Agnès, Alpes-Maritimes, in southern France

United Kingdom 
 St Agnes, Isles of Scilly, England
 St Agnes, Cornwall, England
 St Agnes, Avon, a place in Avon, England
 St Agnes Place, a formerly-squatted street in London, England

Schools
 St. Agnes Academy (Legazpi City), Philippines

United States
 St. Agnes School (Jefferson, Louisiana)
 Saint Agnes High School (Saint Paul, Minnesota)
 St. Agnes School, Albany, New York, a school founded in 1870 and merged into the Doane Stuart School, Rensselaer, New York
 St. Agnes School (Lake Placid, New York), a school in Lake Placid, New York
 St. Agnes Academy-St. Dominic School, Memphis, Tennessee
 Saint Agnes Academy (Texas), Houston, Texas

Other
 Saint Agnes (Massimo Stanzione), a  painting
 Congregation of Sisters of St. Agnes, a Roman Catholic religious order
 The Eve of St. Agnes, an 1819 poem by John Keats, published in 1820
 "St. Agnes", an 1837 poem by Alfred Tennyson, retitled "St. Agnes' Eve" in 1857

See also
 Sant'Agnese (disambiguation)
 St. Agnes Cathedral (disambiguation)
 St. Agnes Church (disambiguation)
 St. Agnes Hospital (disambiguation)